Tomás Martín Feuillet (1832–1862) was a Panamian romantic poet. One of his poems is titled How Much?

References 

1832 births
1862 deaths
Panamanian poets
Panamanian male writers
Male poets
19th-century poets
19th-century male writers